Nigeria competed at the 2022 Winter Olympics in Beijing, China, from 4 to 20 February 2022.

Nigeria's team consisted of one male athlete in cross-country skiing. Seun Adigun, who represented the country in 2018 in the sport of bobsleigh, carried the flag of the country during the opening ceremony. Adigun was at the games as the team's doctor. Meanwhile cross-country skier Samuel Ikpefan was the flagbearer during the closing ceremony.

Competitors
The following is the list of number of competitors participating at the Games per sport/discipline.

Cross-country skiing

By meeting the basic qualification standards, Nigeria qualified one male cross-country skier. This will mark the sport debut for the country at the Winter Olympics. Samuel Ikpefan is scheduled to represent the country in the sport. Ikpefan is a French born skier, and decided to represent the birth nation of his father in international competition. 

Ikpefan competed in two events. In his first event, the men's sprint, Ikpefan had a time of 3:09.57 to finish 73rd out of 88 competitors, failing to advance to the next round.

Distance

Sprint

See also
Tropical nations at the Winter Olympics
Nigeria at the 2022 Commonwealth Games

References

External links
Beijing 2022 – Nigeria

Nations at the 2022 Winter Olympics
2022
Winter Olympics